Katherine Victoria Walsh (April 11, 1947 – October 7, 1970) was an American actress best known for her performance as Lulu in Roger Corman's movie The Trip (1967).

Early life
Walsh was born on April 11, 1947 in Kenton County, Kentucky, (or South Fort Mitchell, Kentucky, to Martha and Thomas Walsh. Her father, Thomas Walsh (died 1965), was President of the Atlantic Underwriters Agency. He was killed in the November 8, 1965 crash of American Airlines Flight 383 in Boone County, Kentucky. She was the family's oldest child, and she had two brothers and two sisters. 

Walsh attended Villa Madonna Academy, Dixie Heights High School, the Royal Academy of Dramatic Art in London, England, and the University of London.

Walsh was discovered at Paramount Studios by a William Morris agent while she was having lunch with a girlfriend. The agent took Walsh to Columbia, where she read scenes, had an interview, and had a screen test. Columbia signed her under a then-new expanded talent program. She was 17 at the time, and Judge Ben Koenig of Los Angeles Superior Court approved the long-term contract.

Career 
Walsh made her acting debut in the 1966 film The Chase. She went on to guest star in various shows such as The Monkees (in the debut episode, "Royal Flush"), The Virginian, and Daniel Boone.

Walsh is best known for the last professional acting assignment of her career, as Lulu in The Trip (1967), starring Dennis Hopper and Peter Fonda, written by Jack Nicholson, and directed by Roger Corman.

Death
On October 7, 1970, Walsh died while at a small party in her flat in Kensington, an area in London, England. The Coroner's report in London returned an open verdict because of insufficient evidence, concluding death was due to alcohol and barbiturate poisoning, but that it had been impossible to establish whether the death was due to suicide or accident.

See also
List of unsolved deaths

References

External links
 
 
 Legends of London

1947 births
1970 deaths
20th-century American actresses
Actresses from Kentucky
Alcohol-related deaths in England
Alumni of RADA
Alumni of University College London
American film actresses
American television actresses
Barbiturates-related deaths
Unsolved deaths in England